Urbano music or Latin urban is a transnational umbrella category including many different genres and styles. As an umbrella term it includes reggaeton, dancehall, dembow, urban champeta, funk carioca and Latin hip hop. The commercial breakthrough of this music took place in 2017. Artists in the style collaborate transnationally, and may originate from the United States including Puerto Rico in particular, Colombia, Cuba, the Dominican Republic, Panama, Venezuela or other Spanish-speaking nations, as well as Portuguese-speaking Brazil.

As Vulture describes it, urbano "encapsulates Spanish-language 'urban' music with roots in the culture of descendants of enslaved peoples across North, South, and Central America". The magazine indicates that "at the core of pretty much every style are rhythms brought from Africa, fostered by enslaved people and blended with indigenous sounds and the language of Latin America's chief colonizer, Spain".

1990s

Origins
In the late 1980s and early 1990s, most Latin rap came from the West Coast of the United States. Cuban-American artist Mellow Man Ace was the first Latino artist to have a major bilingual single attached to his 1989 debut. Mellow Man, referred to as the "Godfather of Latin rap" and a Hip Hop Hall of Fame inductee, brought mainstream attention to Spanglish rhyming with his 1989 platinum single "Mentirosa". In 1990, fellow West Coast artist Kid Frost further brought Latinos to the rap forefront with his single "La Raza". In 1991, Kid Frost, Mellow Man, A.L.T. and several other Latin rappers formed the rap super group Latin Alliance and released a self-titled album which featured the hit "Lowrider (On the Boulevard)". A.L.T. also scored a hit later that year with his remake of the song Tequila. Cypress Hill, of which Mellow Man Ace was a member before going solo, would become the first Latino rap group to reach platinum status in 1991. The group has since continued to release other Gold and Platinum albums. Ecuadorian born rapper Gerardo received heavy rotation on video and radio for his single "Rico, Suave". While commercially watered-down, his album enjoyed a status of being one of the first mainstream Spanglish CDs on the market. Johnny J was a multi-platinum songwriter, music producer, and rapper who was perhaps best known for his production on Tupac Shakur's albums All Eyez on Me and Me Against the World. He also produced the 1990 single Knockin' Boots for his classmate Candyman's album Ain't No Shame in My Game, which eventually went platinum thanks to the single.

Reggae as a musical genre has its origins in Jamaica, and it became popular throughout the 1970s in the black-immigrant communities of the other British West Indies, North America, and Great Britain. Jamaican reggae was embraced in the Spanish-speaking world first in Panama by the descendants of black workers that immigrated to the Isthmus during the construction of the Panama Railroad (mid-19th century), the railways for the banana companies (late 19th century), and the Panama Canal (early 20th century). Prior to the period of construction of the Panama Canal (1904–1915), most of the Afro-Caribbean communities in Panama were of Jamaican descent, but with the construction of the canal these communities grew in diversity with immigrants from other parts of the Caribbean such as Jamaica, Barbados, Martinique, Guadeloupe, Haiti, Trinidad, Dominica, French and British Guyana and other Caribbean Islands.

In 1977, a Guyanese immigrant who went by the nickname "Guyana", along with a local DJ known as "Wassabanga" introduced for first time the reggae rhythms in Panama with lyrics in Spanish. Wassabanga's music along with later interpreters such as Rastanini and Calito Soul, were perhaps the first remarkable cases of Reggae en Español, at a time when many Panamanians were already developing a musical and spiritual bond with the Mecca of reggae music (Kingston, Jamaica), a bond catalyzed mainly by the call to arms issued by the music of Bob Marley.

2000s

Reggaeton
Reggaetón is an urban form of music which has its roots in Latin and Caribbean music. The genre was invented, shaped and made known in Puerto Rico where it got its name; most of its current artists are also from Puerto Rico. After its mainstream exposure in 2004, it spread to North American, European, Asian and African audiences. Reggaeton blends Jamaican musical influences of dancehall, with those of Latin America, such as salsa, bomba, Latin hip hop, and electronica. Vocals include rapping and singing, typically in Spanish. Lyrics tend to be derived from hip hop rather than from dancehall. Like hip hop, reggaeton has caused some controversy, albeit less, due to alleged exploitation of women. While it takes influences from hip hop and Jamaican dancehall, reggaeton is not precisely the Hispanic or Latin American version of either of these genres; reggaeton has its own specific beat and rhythm, whereas Latin hip hop is simply hip hop recorded by artists of Latino descent. The specific "riddim" that characterizes reggaeton is referred to as "Dem Bow". The name is taken from the dancehall song by Shabba Ranks that first popularized the beat in the early 1990s which appears on his album Just Reality.

In 2004, reggaeton became popular in the United States and Europe. Tego Calderón was receiving airplay in the U.S., and the music was popular among youth. Daddy Yankee's El Cangri.com became popular that year in the country, as did Héctor & Tito. Luny Tunes and Noriega's Mas Flow, Yaga & Mackie's Sonando Diferente, Tego Calderón's El Abayarde, Ivy Queen's Diva, Zion & Lennox's Motivando a la Yal and the Desafío compilation were also well received. Rapper N.O.R.E. released a hit single, "Oye Mi Canto". Daddy Yankee released Barrio Fino and a hit single, "Gasolina". Tego Calderón recorded the singles "Pa' Que Retozen" and "Guasa Guasa". Don Omar was popular, particularly in Europe, with "Pobre Diabla" and "Dale Don Dale". Other popular reggaeton artists include Tony Dize, Angel & Khriz, Nina Sky, Dyland & Lenny, RKM & Ken-Y, Julio Voltio, Calle 13, Héctor el Father, Wisin & Yandel and Tito El Bambino. In late 2004 and early 2005 Shakira recorded "La Tortura" and "La Tortura – Shaketon Remix" for her album, Fijación Oral Vol. 1 (Oral Fixation Vol. 1), popularizing reggaeton in North America, Europe and Asia. Musicians began to incorporate bachata into reggaeton, with Ivy Queen releasing singles ("Te He Querido, Te He Llorado" and "La Mala") featuring bachata's signature guitar sound, slower, romantic rhythms and emotive singing style. Daddy Yankee's "Lo Que Paso, Paso" and Don Omar's "Dile" are also bachata-influenced. In 2005 producers began to remix existing reggaeton music with bachata, marketing it as bachaton: "bachata, Puerto Rican style".

2010s

Dominican Urban Movement 
Around the early and mid 2000s, a variety of urban rhythms such as merengue urbano, Dominican Hip Hop and mainly Dominican Dembow born as an artistic expression from underground and low social classes. Since 2005, a considerate amount of artists are hitting it the airways and receiving mainstream exposure Dominican Republic. In 2006, Don Miguelo become the first urban act to receive national airplay and mainstream exposure, winning best new artist at 2006 Casandra Awards while the track "Ma` Taide" hit 15 at US Tropical Airplay. In 2007 and 2008, Lapiz Conciente become the first hip hop act to receive attention by local media while Vakero introduced elements of reggae and afropop on his songs and was named Top 5 Hot Rising Latin Urban Act by Billboard.

On late 2000s and 2010s, a new format of merengue become very popular—Merengue de Calle or Urban Merengue. Omega is referenced as one of the most popular act and was the recipient of Best Merengue Urban act in 2009 and 2010 Casandra Awards, Dominican Republic most prestigious award. Eventually, his studio albums El Dueño del Flow (2009) and El Dueño del Flow (2011) charted inside US Top Latin Albums and Tropical Albums and had collaborated with other such as Daddy Yankee, Ozuna, Shakira, Akon, Pitbull among others.

In 2011, Vakero become the first recipient of Best Urban Act of the Soberano Awards. In 2014, Don Miguelo released the track "Como Yo Le Doy" with Pitbull which at number one on US Tropical Songs and 16 on Hot Latin Songs. It was nominated at Premios Juventud 2015 and was certified platinum by the RIAA for selling over 60,000 units in the United States becoming the first urban act to do so. In 2015, Mozart La Para hit the top 20 at US Tropical Airplay and Latin Rhythm charts with the track "Llegan ls Montro Men" and later signed a recording contract worth $2 million to Roc Nation. In 2016, Lapiz Conciente studio album Latidos debut at number 7 of US Billboard Latin Albums and the next year was nominated for Best Urban Song at 18th Annual Latin Grammy Awards for his track "Papa" with veteran rapper Vico C.

Colombia's Reglobalization
Colombian artists like Maluma or J Balvin put out hits every two or three months, and the South American country pays tribute to this genre in all its cities. If Medellin concentrates the most successful artists and producers, Bogota has specialized itself in theme parties around this rhythm. One of the keys to the success of this music is its ability to eliminate the existing social gaps in Colombian society, since this genre triumphs both in the humble neighborhoods of southern Bogota and in the most exclusive clubs in Zona T or the Parque de la 93.

Karol G is a Colombian reggaetón singer who has done collaborations with other reggaetón singers, such as J Balvin, Bad Bunny, and Maluma. Throughout her career, Karol G has had troubles in the industry because reggaetón is a genre that is dominated by male artists. She recounts how when starting her career she noticed that there were not many opportunities for her in the genre because reggaetón was dominated by male artists. In 2018, Karol G's single "Mi Cama" became very popular and she made a remix with J Balvin and Nicky Jam. The "Mi Cama" remix appeared in the top 10 Hot Latin Songs and number 1 in Latin Airplay charts. This year she has collaborated with Maluma called Creeme and with Anuel AA in "Culpables". The single "Culpables" has been in the top 10 Hot Latin Songs for 2 consecutive weeks.

Funk Carioca
Funk carioca was a direct derivative of samba, Afrobeat, Miami bass, Latin music, traditional African religious music, Candomble, hip hop and freestyle (another Miami-based genre) music from the US. The reason why these genres, very localized in the US, became popular and influential in Rio de Janeiro is due to proximity. Miami was a popular plane stop for Rio DJs to buy the latest American records. Along with the Miami influence came the longtime influence of the slave trade in Colonial Brazil. Various African religions like vodun, and candomble were brought with the enslaved Africans to the Americas. The same beat is found in Afro-Religious music in the African diaspora and many black Brazilians identify as being part of this religion. This genre of music was mainly started by those in black communities in Brazil, therefore a boiling pot of influences to derive the trademark.

Latin trap
Latin trap is a subgenre of trap music that originated in Puerto Rico. A direct descendant of southern hip hop, and influenced by reggaeton, it gained popularity after 2007, and has since spread throughout Latin America. The trap is slang for a place where drugs are sold. Latin trap is similar to mainstream trap with lyrics about life on la calle (the street), drugs, sex and violence, without censorship. Puerto Rican reggaeton and Latin trap singer Ozuna states that it originated in 2007 with the song "El Pistolón", performed by Arcángel & De La Ghetto, Yaga & Mackie, and Jowell & Randy (the former two were duo at the time). In an August 2017 article for Billboard's series, "A Brief History Of", they enlisted some of the key artists of Latin trap, including Ozuna, De La Ghetto, Bad Bunny, Farruko and Messiah- to narrate a brief history on the genre. In 2018, Cardi B's hit single "I Like It" featuring Bad Bunny and J Balvin became the first Latin trap song to reach number one on the US Billboard Hot 100 chart.

The 'Despacito' effect and Mainstream  Resurgence of Reggaeton
In 2017, the music video for "Despacito" by Luis Fonsi featuring Daddy Yankee reached over a billion views in under 3 months. As of December 2020, the music video is the second most viewed YouTube video of all-time. With its 3.3 million certified sales plus track-equivalent streams, "Despacito" became one of the best-selling Latin singles in the United States.

The success of the song and its remix version led Daddy Yankee to become the most listened-to artist worldwide on the streaming service Spotify on July 9, 2017, being the first Latin artist to do so. He later became the fifth most listened-to male artist and the sixth overall of 2017 on Spotify. In June 2017, "Despacito" was cited by Billboards Leila Cobo as the song that renewed interest in the Latin music market from recording labels in the United States. Julyssa Lopez of The Washington Post stated that the successes of "Despacito" and J Balvin's "Mi Gente" is "the beginning of a new Latin crossover era." Stephanie Ho of Genius website wrote that "the successes of 'Despacito' and 'Mi Gente' could point to the beginning of a successful wave for Spanish-language music in the US." Ho also stated that "as 'Despacito' proves, fans don't need to understand the language in order to enjoy the music", referring to the worldwide success of the song, including various non-Spanish-speaking countries.

'Te Bote' Spawning Imitators
In April 2018, Te Boté, released by Nio Garcia, Casper Magico, Darell, Ozuna, Bad Bunny, and Nicky Jam. It became the first dancehall song to have reached number one on the Billboard Hot Latin Songs chart. It currently has over 1.8 billion viewers in YouTube. But Te Boté not only achieved that. Many artists began to mark strong commercial trends in a market dominated by mixing Reggaeton and Latin trap. For example, "Adictiva" by Daddy Yankee and Anuel AA, "Asesina" by Brytiago and Darell, "Cuando Te Besé" by Becky G and Paulo Londra, "No Te Veo" by Casper Magico, have influenced the style.

2020s

Argentina's urbano movement
In the beginnings of 2020, a new generation brought more Argentinean identity to urbano. The songs "Colocao" by Nicki Nicole, and "Mamichula" by Trueno and Nicole were the first urbano songs on the list of number-one singles of 2020 in Spain; they also reached the Argentina Hot 100.

See also

List of Urbano artists
Reggaeton
Reggae en Español
Latin hip hop
Bachatón
Dembow
Latin trap
Latin Rhythm Albums
Latin Rhythm Airplay
Latin Grammy Award for Best Urban Music Album
Latin Grammy Award for Best Urban Song
Objetivo Fama

References

 
21st-century music genres
2000s in Latin music
2010s in Latin music
2020s in Latin music
Reggaeton
Fusion music genres
Puerto Rican styles of music
Colombian styles of music